Patrik Sigurður Gunnarsson (born 15 November 2000) is an Icelandic professional footballer who plays as a goalkeeper for Viking FK.

A product of the Breiðablik academy and Brentford B, Patrik played the majority of his early senior career away on loan from the two clubs. Following a successful loan spell with Viking in 2021, he transferred permanently to the club the following year. Patrik was capped by Iceland at youth level and made his senior international debut in 2022.

Club career

Breiðablik 
A goalkeeper, Patrik progressed through the Breiðablik academy in his native Iceland to make two appearances for the club's U19 team in the 2016–17 UEFA Youth League, while aged 15. He appeared again in the 2017–18 edition of the tournament. Patrik was unused substitute for the first team on four occasions during the 2017 season and in May 2017, he signed a -year contract.

Patrick signed a new three-year contract in November 2017 and joined 1. deild karla club ÍR on loan for the duration of the 2018 season. He made 10 appearances before the loan was terminated on 8 June 2018, the same day on which he departed the club permanently.

Brentford 
On 8 June 2018, Patrik moved to England to join the B team at Championship club Brentford on a two-year contract, with the option of a further year, effective 1 July 2018. Injuries to second and third-choice goalkeepers Luke Daniels and Ellery Balcombe saw Patrik win his maiden calls into the first team squad in early-March 2019 and he made his debut as a 75th-minute substitute for Daniel Bentley in a 2–1 victory over Middlesbrough on 9 March. He made 31 appearances for the B team during the 2018–19 season and was a part of the squad which won the 2018–19 Middlesex Senior Cup.

In June 2019, Patrik signed a new four-year contract, with the option of a further year and was a part of the first team squad during the majority of the 2019–20 pre-season. He was promoted into the first team squad in September 2019 and was an unused substitute in cup matches during the season. On 20 February 2020, Patrik joined League One club Southend United on a seven-day emergency loan, which was subsequently extended by two further weeks. He made three appearances during his spell.

Patrick spent the entire 2020–21 season away on loan at Danish 1st Division clubs Viborg FF and Silkeborg IF, switching clubs during the mid-season transfer window. He made 26 appearances during the season and both clubs secured promotion to the Danish Superliga. In his absence, Brentford were promoted to the Premier League after victory in the 2021 Championship play-off Final. After remaining an unused substitute during two early 2021–22 season matches, Patrik departed on loan until the end of 2021. Following the spell, he transferred away from the Community Stadium in January 2022.

Viking FK 
On 30 August 2021, Patrik joined Norwegian Eliteserien club Viking on loan until the end of the 2021 season. He made eight appearances during his spell and helped the team to a third-place finish, which secured a Europa Conference League berth. On 17 January 2022, Patrik joined the club on a permanent contract for an undisclosed fee and he made 37 appearances during a mid-table 2022 season.

International career 
Patrik has been capped by Iceland at U16, U17, U18, U19 and U21 level. In March 2021, Patrik was named in Iceland's 2021 UEFA European U21 Championship finals squad and played in two of the three group stage matches before the team's elimination.

Patrik received his first call-up to the senior team for two friendly matches in January 2020 and remained an unused substitute in both. After featuring as an unused substitute during a 5–1 2020–21 UEFA Nations League A defeat to Belgium in September 2020, Patrik was an unused substitute during six 2022 FIFA World Cup qualifiers in 2021. He remained an unused substitute during two 2022–23 UEFA Nations League B matches, before making his senior international debut with a start in a 1–0 friendly victory over San Marino on 9 June 2022. Patrik's second cap came in the 2022 Baltic Cup Final, where his penalty save in the shoot-out versus Latvia saw Iceland win the tournament.

Personal life 
Patrik is the son of retired goalkeeper Gunnar Sigurðsson. He is a Breiðablik and Manchester United supporter. In May 2022, a scandal erupted In Norway, when a video published by Stavanger Aftenblad showed Gunnarsson reducing his goal size, by literally moving the goalposts 15–20 centimetres inwards, after the referee's inspection, but prior to kickoff, in home games during the early months of the 2022 season.

Career statistics

Club

International

Honours 
Brentford B
 Middlesex Senior Cup: 2018–19
Viborg FF

 Danish 1st Division: 2020–21

Silkeborg IF

 Danish 1st Division second-place promotion: 2020–21
Iceland

 Baltic Cup: 2022

References

External links

Patrik Gunnarsson at vikingfotball.no

2000 births
Living people
Patrik Gunnarsson
Association football goalkeepers
Patrik Gunnarsson
Patrik Gunnarsson
ÍR men's football players
Brentford F.C. players
Southend United F.C. players
Viborg FF players
Silkeborg IF players
Viking FK players
1. deild karla players
English Football League players
Danish 1st Division players
Eliteserien players
Patrik Gunnarsson
Patrik Gunnarsson
Patrik Gunnarsson
Expatriate footballers in England
Expatriate men's footballers in Denmark
Expatriate footballers in Norway
Patrik Gunnarsson
Patrik Gunnarsson
Patrik Gunnarsson
Iceland international footballers